Miracle in Cell No. 7 is a 2019 Turkish drama film directed by Mehmet Ada Öztekin. It is an official adaptation of the 2013 South Korean comedy-drama film Miracle in Cell No. 7 using the same premise, but with significant changes in story, characters, and tone. It was selected as the Turkish entry for the Best International Feature Film at the 93rd Academy Awards, but it was not nominated.

Plot
In 2004, an upcoming bride becomes emotional as news comes out that capital punishment in Turkey has been abolished. The story then moves to a flashback to a village in 1983. A mentally impaired father, Mehmet "Memo" Koyuncu, lives with his young daughter, Ova, and his grandmother on a hillside. On a visit to the town, he figures in a slight altercation with the daughter of a local military officer over a bag that Ova also wants. Later, while wandering in the hills, Memo meets the officer's daughter, who offers the bag if he could catch her. However, the girl accidentally dies after falling off a cliff, and Memo's attempts to save her are misunderstood to be an act of murder and he is sent to prison but not before he tells Ova that he saw a witness to what really happened. In prison, he is speedily convicted of murder and sentenced to death, and is beaten up by fellow inmates who are unaware of the true circumstances of his case.

Despite his harrowing experience, Memo saves the leader of his cell from being killed by another inmate and befriends the rest of his cellmates. Sometime afterwards, Ova sneaks out of their house and leaves a note to her grandmother stating her intent to go to her father, which leads to her dying of a heart attack upon reading it. Ova manages to smuggle herself into the prison, bonding with her father and befriending the inmates and the wardens such that they fully realize that Memo couldn't possibly have committed the crime. They then plan to prove his innocence. 

Ova finds a deserter who witnessed Memo's alleged crime, who confirmed that it was an accident and that Memo was innocent. After hearing this, they ask the Chief Warden and his aide to investigate about the deserter. The deserter is found, only to be killed by the dead girl's father to ensure Memo is executed.

Days after the execution, the Warden reveals to Ova that one of the cellmates volunteered to secretly take Memo's place in the execution to ensure Memo escapes from jail and that some of his fellow inmates arranged for their accomplices on the outside to delay the officer's arrival to ensure he does not realize the deception. The Chief Warden and his aide assist Memo and Ova in fleeing the country on a boat to seek asylum abroad.

Cast
 Aras Bulut İynemli:    Memo
 Nisa Aksongur: Ova (as a child)
 Celile Toyon: Fatma Nene
 İlker Aksum: Askorozlu
 Mesut Akusta: Yusuf
 Deniz Baysal: Mine
 Yurdaer Okur: Aydın
 Yıldıray Şahinler: Hafız
 Sarp Akkaya: Nail
 Deniz Celiloğlu: Faruk
 Ferit Kaya: Ali
 Serhan Onat: Selim
 Emre Yetim: Ayna
 Gülçin Kültür Şahin: Hatice
 Cankat Aydos: Fugitive Soldier
 Doğukan Polat: Tevfik
 Hayal Köseoğlu: Ova (as an adult)

Reception
The film was the most watched film in Turkish theaters in 2019, with more than 5.3 million admissions. It also gained a large worldwide audience due to its release on Netflix, especially in France and Latin America, where it topped the charts.

See also
 List of submissions to the 93rd Academy Awards for Best International Feature Film
 List of Turkish submissions for the Academy Award for Best International Feature Film

References

External links
 

CJ Entertainment films
Turkish drama films
2010s prison drama films
Films about miscarriage of justice
Films about mental health
Turkish films about revenge
Films about Islam
Remakes of South Korean films
2019 drama films
2019 films
Shot-for-shot remakes